Miranda is a municipality in Falcón State, Venezuela. The municipality is one of several in Venezuela named "Miranda Municipality" for independence hero Francisco de Miranda.

The main center of population is Coro, the capital of Falcón State.

Municipalities of Falcón